"Viens boire un p'tit coup à la maison" (approx. Come home to have a drink) is a 1987 song recorded by the French band Licence IV. Released as a single in March 1987, the song achieved a huge success in France, becoming one of the best-selling singles of the 1980s in France.

Music and lyrics
This drinking song was composed by Jean-Jacques Lafon under the pseudonym of J.Falon. This French singer has had a smash hit in 1986 with "Le Géant de papier". Very popular, the song deals with the tasting of the wine and the sausage, in company with some friends, in a festive atmosphere. Licence IV was a male duet composed of Olivier Guillot and Francis Vacher, who were respectively the secretary and the artistic director of Patrick Sébastien. Gillou - Pierre Perret's accordionist -, who is mentioned in the lyrics, also participated in the composition of the song.

Chart performance
In France, "Viens boire un p'tit coup à la maison" debuted at number 27 on 10 October 1987, reached the top ten two weeks later and became number one in its sixth week, staying atop for consecutive 13 weeks, which was at the time the record of the most weeks at the top for a single (this record was also carried out the previous year by the band Images with their hit "Les Démons de minuit"). The single totaled 23 weeks in the top ten and 32 weeks in the top 50, and was certified Platinum disc by the Syndicat National de l'Édition Phonographique.

The band did not release another song, nor any album.

Cover versions
A parody named Viens fumer un p'tit joint à la maison was released in 2003 by Bruno Blum. The song was covered by Les Enfoirés on their album 2011: Dans l'œil des Enfoirés, and included in the medley "Troisième Sexe". The song was performed by Lorie, Alizée, Claire Keim, Nolwenn Leroy, Amel Bent, Mimie Mathy, Jenifer Bartoli, Tina Arena, Patricia Kaas, Pascal Obispo, Jean-Louis Aubert, Grégoire, Kad Merad, Patrick Bruel, MC Solaar, Christophe Maé, Jean-Jacques Goldman and Sébastien Loeb.

Track listings
 7" single
 "Viens boire un p'tit coup à la maison" — 3:27
 "Viens boire un p'tit coup à la maison" (instrumental) — 4:12

Charts

Weekly charts

Year-end charts

Certifications

References

1987 debut singles
Licence IV songs
SNEP Top Singles number-one singles
Songs about alcohol